Takewaki (written: 竹脇) is a Japanese surname. Notable people with the surname include:

, Japanese actor
, Japanese bobsledder

See also
Takeaki

Japanese-language surnames